CK Hutchison Holdings Limited is a Hong Kongbased and Cayman Islandsregistered multinational conglomerate corporation. The company was formed in March 2015 through the merger of Cheung Kong Holdings and its main associate company Hutchison Whampoa. It has four core businesses  ports and related services, retail, infrastructure and telecommunications  which operate in over 50 countries, as well as several other investments around the world.

Holdings
The company owns substantial holdings in businesses across a number of industries.

Telecoms
The Group’s telecommunications division is a leading global operator and innovator of converged telecommunication and digital services around the world.
 CK Hutchison Group Telecom – operates 3-branded mobile telephone networks in Austria, Denmark, Ireland, Sweden and the United Kingdom.
 Hutchison Asia Telecom Group – operates mobile telephone networks in Indonesia, Sri Lanka and Vietnam.
 Hutchison Telecommunications Lanka
 Indosat Ooredoo Hutchison (65,6% via Ooredoo Hutchison Asia, where CKH co-owned its 50% stake with Ooredoo) – operates the 3 network in Indonesia as well as IM3.
 Vietnamobile – co-owned with Hanoi Telecom.
 Hutchison Telecommunications Hong Kong Holdings (66.09%) – operates 3-branded mobile telephone networks in Hong Kong and Macau.
 TPG Telecom (25.05% effective interest, formerly Vodafone Hutchison Australia) – the second-largest telecommunications company in Australia, owned via the 87.87% CKH-owned Hutchison Telecommunications.
 Wind Tre (100%) – Italian operator of fixed and mobile telephony, born from the merger between Wind and 3 Italy.
 Metro Broadcast Corporation

Infrastructure
The company has investments in energy infrastructure, transportation infrastructure, water infrastructure, waste management, waste-to-energy and household infrastructure. Its investments and operations span across Hong Kong, Mainland China, the United Kingdom, Continental Europe, Australia, New Zealand, Canada and the United States.
 CK Infrastructure Holding(75.67%) – owns a number of infrastructure companies around the world.
 Eversholt Rail Group
 Australian Gas Networks
 UK Power Networks
 Northern Gas Networks
 Northumbrian Water Group
 Park 'N Fly Airport Parking
 Wales & West Utilities
Power Assets Holdings (35.96%)
Hongkong Electric Company – Minority 33.37% holding is held through Power Assets Holdings.

Ports
As the world’s leading port investor, developer and operator, the Group’s ports division holds interests in 52 ports comprising 291 operational berths in 27 countries, including container terminals operating in six of the 10 busiest container ports in the world. In 2021, the division handled a total throughput of 88.0 million twenty-foot equivalent units (“TEU”). It also engages in river trade, cruise terminal operations and ports related logistic services.
 Hutchison Port Holdings
Westports Holdings (18.84% effective interest)
 Hutchison Port Holdings Trust (30.07%)

Retail
The Group’s retail division is the world’s largest international health and beauty retailer, with over 16,300 stores in 28 markets worldwide. Its retail portfolio comprises health and beauty products, supermarkets, as well as consumer electronics and electrical appliances. It also manufactures and distributes bottled water and beverage products in Hong Kong and Mainland China.
 A.S. Watson Group (75%) – health and beauty retail group, with subsidiaries around the world.
Watsons
ParknShop
Superdrug
The Perfume Shop
Savers Health & Beauty
Kruidvat
Trekpleister
PT Duta Intidaya (55.44% effective interest)

Other
 Cenovus Energy (15.71%) – Canadian energy company.
 Hutchison Water
HUTCHMED (38.46%)
 CK Life Sciences (45.32%)
 TOM Group (36.11%)
Marionnaud
 AlipayHK (a joint venture with Alibaba's Ant Financial)

Senior Directorship

List of chairmen 
Li Ka-shing (1950–2018)
 Victor Li (2018– )

List of managing directors 

 Li Ka-shing (1950–1998)
 Victor Li (1999–2015)
 Victor Li and Canning Fok (2015– )

List of senior advisors 

 Li Ka-shing (2018– )

See also 
 CK Asset Holdings

References

External links

 

 
Conglomerate companies of Hong Kong
Companies listed on the Hong Kong Stock Exchange